Ancylis unculana is a moth belonging to the family Tortricidae. The species was first described by Adrian Hardy Haworth in 1811.

It is native to Europe.

References

Enarmoniini